Hungarian Rhapsody No. 15, subtitled Rákóczi March, S.244/15, in A minor, is the fifteenth Hungarian Rhapsody by Franz Liszt. Written in 1853, the rhapsody is based on the Rákóczi March. An average performance of the piece lasts around six minutes.

Structure 
The rhapsody is composed of three distinct sections: 

 The march (Tempo di Marcia animato) has the melody of the Rákóczi March and is in A minor.
 Un poco meno allegro is a slower section in A Major. A cadenza then leads to the third section.
 The third section is a recapitulation of the march

References

External links 
 

15
1853 compositions

Compositions in A minor